Shivavakan (also Romanized as Shīvāvakān) is a village in Gavork-e Nalin Rural District, Vazineh District, Sardasht County, West Azerbaijan Province, Iran. At the 2006 census, its population was 176, in 26 families.

References 

Populated places in Sardasht County